is a Japanese snowboarder. She won a silver medal in big air at Winter X Games XXII.

At the 2023 X Games, she became the first female to land a triple underflip in competition. She did so while competing in women’s snowboard big air, and won a gold medal in it.

References

External links
 
 
 
 

2001 births
Living people
X Games athletes
Japanese female snowboarders
Snowboarders at the 2018 Winter Olympics
Snowboarders at the 2022 Winter Olympics
Olympic snowboarders of Japan
21st-century Japanese women